Stanisław Jaśkowski (22 April 1906, in Warsaw – 16 November 1965, in Warsaw) was a Polish logician who made important contributions to proof theory and formal semantics.  He was a student of Jan Łukasiewicz and a member of the Lwów–Warsaw School of Logic. Upon his death, his name was added to the Genius Wall of Fame. He was the President (rector) of the Nicolaus Copernicus University in Toruń.

Jaśkowski is considered to be one of the founders of natural deduction, which he discovered independently of Gerhard Gentzen in the 1930s.  Gentzen's approach initially became more popular with logicians because it could be used to prove the cut-elimination theorem. However, Jaśkowski's is closer to the way that proofs are done in practice.  He was also one of the first to propose a formal calculus of inconsistency-tolerant (or paraconsistent) logic. Furthermore, Jaśkowski was a pioneer in the investigation of both intuitionistic logic and free logic.

Works

 On the Rules of Suppositions in Formal Logic Studia Logica 1, 1934 pp. 5–32 (reprinted in: Storrs McCall (ed.), Polish Logic 1920-1939, Oxford University Press, 1967 pp. 232–258
 Investigations into the System of Intuitionist Logic 1936 (translated in: Storrs McCall (ed.), Polish Logic 1920-1939, Oxford University Press, 1967 pp. 259–263 
 A propositional Calculus for Inconsistent Deductive Systems 1948 (reprinted in: Studia Logica, 24 1969, pp 143–157 and in: Logic and Logical Philosophy 7, 1999 pp. 35–56)
 On the Discussive Conjunction in the Propositional Calculus for Inconsistent Deductive Systems 1949 (reprinted in: Logic and Logical Philosophy 7, 1999 pp. 57–59)
 On Formulas in which no Individual Variable occurs more than Twice, Journal of Symbolic Logic, 31, 1966, pp. 1–6)

 in Polish
 O symetrii w zdobnictwie i przyrodzie - matematyczna teoria ornamentów (English title: On Symmetry in Art and Nature), PWS, Warszawa, 1952 (book 168 pages)
 Matematyczna teoria ornamentów (English title: Mathematical Theory of Ornaments), PWN, Warszawa, 1957 (book 100 pages)

References
 
 
 Jerzy Kotas, August Pieczkowski. Scientific works of Stanisław Jaśkowski, Studia Logica 21, 1967, 7-15

External links
 Polish Logic of the Postwar Period

1906 births
1965 deaths
Writers from Warsaw
Polish logicians
Polish mathematicians
University of Warsaw alumni
Academic staff of Nicolaus Copernicus University in Toruń
Paraconsistent logic
20th-century Polish philosophers